Charles L. Young Sr. (August 27, 1931 – April 29, 2009) was an American businessman, veteran of the Korean War who earned a Bronze Star, and politician in Mississippi. He advanced in the family business started by his father, becoming president in 1969 and expanding the sale of E.F. Young Jr. Manufacturing Company products into markets in Canada and the Caribbean. In 1980 he was elected to the Mississippi State Legislature, and was repeatedly re-elected, serving nearly three decades from Meridian, Mississippi until his death.

Biography
Charles Lemuel Young Sr. was born in Meridian, Mississippi in Lauderdale County, Mississippi, the eldest son and second of three children of E. F. Young Jr., an African-American entrepreneur and Velma Beal (November 4, 1902–February 1987).

The year he was born, his father E. F. Young Jr. founded the E. F. Young Jr. Manufacturing Company in Meridian, Mississippi.  Within a few years, he built it up as one of the most prominent black-owned businesses in the South. Like his two siblings, Young would be exposed to the family business at an early age. In 1950, while he was attending Tennessee State University, a historically black college in Nashville, his father died.

After graduating in 1951, Young entered the US Army and served in the Korean War. He was awarded the Bronze Star.

He married Doretha Connor of Port Arthur, Texas on August 4, 1960. They had four children together:
Charles Lemuel "Chuck" Young Jr., serves in the Mississippi House of Representatives, District 82 (2012–present)
Deidre Young-Milton
Arthur S. Young
Vel(dore) Young-Graham, serves as County Court Judge for Lauderdale County, Mississippi

E. F. Young Jr. Manufacturing Company
Young was actively involved with the family business for fifteen years, advancing to the position of president in 1969. Under his leadership, the company expanded its markets into Canada and the Caribbean, selling products for people of African descent.

As an entrepreneur, Young established himself in the local business community. He was the first African-American member of the Meridian Chamber of Commerce. He also became active in the Democratic Party, with which most African Americans affiliated after regaining the ability to vote under national civil rights legislation.

Electoral history

In 1980, Young was elected to the Mississippi House of Representatives. He was repeatedly re-elected, serving for almost three decades until his death.

2003

2007

His son, Charles, Jr., was elected to his former seat in 2012.

Death

Young suffered a massive heart attack and died at the Rush Foundation Hospital in Meridian, Mississippi on Wednesday, April 29, 2009.

References
Phelps, Shirelle (editor), Who's Who Among African Americans, Gale Research, Detroit; London, 1998 (Eleventh Edition)

External links
E. F. Young Jr. Manufacturing Company
University of Southern Mississippi - "Civil Rights Document Project"

1931 births
2009 deaths
Members of the Mississippi House of Representatives
American manufacturing businesspeople
Cosmetics people
People from Meridian, Mississippi
Tennessee State University alumni
20th-century American politicians